Metal Swim is a heavy metal compilation album released by Adult Swim. The album was released as a free download on their website. It consisted of rare and unreleased material from various metal bands.

Track listing
 Death Angel – "Truce" (3:30)
 Skeletonwitch – "Bringers of Death" (2:55)
 Torche – "Arrowhead" (2:17)
 Ludicra – "Path of Ash" (9:20)
 Kylesa – "Forsaken" (3:41)
 Black Tusk – "Fatal Kiss" (3:53)
 Red Fang – "Hank Is Dead" (2:34)
 Black Cobra – "Frozen Night" (4:57)
 Saviours – "Dixie Dieway" (5:48)
 Witch Mountain – "Veil of the Forgotten" (5:09)
 Isis – "Pliable Foe" (7:43)
 Jesu – "Dethroned" (7:10)
 Pelican – "Inch Above Sand" (3:32)
 Zoroaster – "Witch's Hammer" (4:11)
 Withered – "Extinguished with the Weary" (5:27)
 Boris – "Luna" (9:59)

References

Albums free for download by copyright owner
Williams Street Records compilation albums
2010 compilation albums
Heavy metal compilation albums